Plankton is a generic term for many organisms that live in bodies of water.

Plankton may also refer to:
Aerial plankton, atmospheric analogue to oceanic plankton
Phytoplankton, the autotrophic component of the plankton community
Plankton and Karen, characters from the Nickelodeon cartoon show SpongeBob SquarePants.
Plankton Man, the stage name of Mexican musician Ignacio Chavez
Plankton Records, label of Drottnar and other bands
 Plankton net, an equipment to collect plankton
 Plankton, a 1994 video from Alvaro Passeri